| music          = Songs:  Aadesh Shrivastav  Robby Badal  Sanjeev Darshan  Lyrics:  Sameer
| cinematography = Paneer Selvam
| editing        = Prakash Jha
| studio         = B.M.B Music & Magnetics Ltd.
| distributor    = Zee Music
| released       = 
| runtime        = 130 minutes
| country        = India
| language       = Hindi
| gross          = 5.5 Cr 5 days 
}}
Dirty Politics is a 2015 Hindi-language Indian political thriller film written and directed by K. C. Bokadia with an ensemble cast. The film was released on 6 March 2015 with an adult rating due to its strong sexual content.

Plot

The film is based on the infamous Bhanwari Devi case of an auxiliary nurse from Rajasthan, who was disappeared on 1 September 2011.

Cast
 Naseeruddin Shah as Manoj Singh
 Mallika Sherawat as Anokhi Devi
 Jackie Shroff as Mukhtiar Khan 
 Anupam Kher as CBI officer Satya Prakash Mishra
 Om Puri as Dina Nath Singh, Jan Seva Party President
 Atul Kulkarni as Nirbhay Singh, Police Inspector
 Rahul Solanki
 Ashutosh Rana as Dayal Singh
 Rajpal Yadav as Banaram, Anokhi Devi's bodyguard
 Sushant Singh as Nischay Singh, Police Inspector
 Govind Namdev as Karan Singh, Police Superintendent
 Charu Sharma
 Awadhesh Mishra as Jabbar Singh
 Sunil Pal as Nathu Lal
 Komal Nahta as Newsreader

Production

Soundtrack
The soundtrack of the film is composed by Sanjeev Darshan and Aadesh Shrivastava, with lyrics penned by Sameer. It was Aadesh Shrivastav's last film as a music composer.

Critical reception 
This film received highly negative reviews from critics, criticising everything

Release

References

External links
 

2015 films
2010s Hindi-language films
Indian political thriller films
Films about corruption in India
Indian films based on actual events
2010s political thriller films
Films directed by K. C. Bokadia